Aïn Harrouda (Berber: ⵄⵢⵏ ⵃⴰⵔⵔⵓⴷⴰ) is a city in Morocco, situated 17 km northeast of Casablanca. 

It recorded a population of 62,420 in the 2014 Moroccan census. According to the 2004 census it had a population of 41,853 inhabitants.

References

Populated places in Casablanca-Settat